Tristan Stubbs (born 14 August 2000) is a South African cricketer. He made his international debut for the South Africa cricket team in June 2022.

Career
Stubbs made his first-class debut on 16 January 2020, for Eastern Province in the 2019–20 CSA 3-Day Provincial Cup. He made his List A debut on 16 February 2020, for Eastern Province in the 2019–20 CSA Provincial One-Day Challenge. He made his Twenty20 debut on 21 February 2021, for Warriors in the 2020–21 CSA T20 Challenge. In April 2021, he was named in Eastern Province's squad, ahead of the 2021–22 cricket season in South Africa.

In May 2022, the Mumbai Indians added Stubbs to their squad for the 2022 Indian Premier League (IPL), replacing Tymal Mills who was ruled out due to an injury. Later the same month, Stubbs was named in South Africa's Twenty20 International (T20I) squad for their series against India, his maiden international call-up. He made his T20I debut on 9 June 2022, for South Africa against India.

In July 2022, he was signed by the Jaffna Kings for the third edition of the Lanka Premier League.

In March 2023, he was named in South Africa's One Day International (ODI) squad for their series against West Indies. He made his ODI debut in the second ODI of the series on 18 March 2023.

Honours
 The Hundred runner up 2022
 SA20 winner 2022-23

References

External links
 

2000 births
Living people
South African cricketers
South Africa Twenty20 International cricketers
Eastern Province cricketers
Warriors cricketers
Mumbai Indians cricketers
Place of birth missing (living people)
Manchester Originals cricketers